The BRP Teotimo Figoracion (PC-389) is the eighteenth ship of the Jose Andrada class coastal patrol boats of the Philippine Navy. It is part of the Batch II of its class ordered through US Foreign Military Sales (FMS) in 1993, and was commissioned with the Philippine Navy in 1996.

It was initially designated as Fast Patrol Craft, and was numbered "DF-389", but later on was re-designated as a Patrol Gunboat, and was finally re-numbered as "PG-389". Another round of reclassification was made in April 2016, which redesignated the boat, from patrol gunboat to coastal patrol craft "PC-389".

Technical Details
The ship was built to US Coast Guard standards with aluminium hull and superstructure.

The ship originally designed to carry one bow Mk.3 40 mm gun, one 81 mm  mortar aft, and four 12.7 mm/50 calibre machine guns. Instead, she is armed with one 25mm Bushmaster chain gun on Mk.38 Mod.0 mount, four M2HB Browning 12.7 mm/50 calibre machine guns on Mk.26 mounts, with two positioned forward and two aft; and two M60 7.62 mm/30 caliber machine guns, both mounted amidships. The ship can carry 4,000 rounds of 12.7 mm and 2,000 rounds of 7.62 mm A large "Big Eyes" binocular is also carried on tripod mounts, one on the forecastle and one just above the mast.

As part of the second batch (PG-379 to PG-390), it is equipped with Mk.38 Mod.0 M242 Bushmaster 25mm chain gun that the first batch of ships do not carry.

She is equipped with a Raytheon AN/SPS-64(V)11 surface search and navigation radar but with a smaller antenna as those used in bigger Philippine Navy ships. Like all other Philippine Navy ship, she was installed with the Philippine Navy Vessel Tracking System (VTS) by the Naval Sea Systems Command.

A 4-meter rigid inflatable boat powered by a 40-hp outboard motor is stowed amidships.

Footnotes

References

External links
 Philippine Navy Official website
 Philippine Fleet Official Website
 Philippine Defense Forum

Patrol vessels of the Philippine Navy
1995 ships